Vernéřovice is a municipality and village in Náchod District in the Hradec Králové Region of the Czech Republic. It has about 300 inhabitants.

Geography
It borders Poland in the north. It lies in the Broumov Highlands. The village is situated along the Vernéřovický Stream, which springs here. The Stěnava River flows along the northeastern municipal border.

History
The first written mention of Vernéřovice is from 1351, when it was known as Wernhirsdorf.

References

External links

Villages in Náchod District